Cao Lin (died 11 March 256) was a prince of the state of Cao Wei in the Three Kingdoms period of China. He was a son of Cao Cao, a warlord who rose to prominence towards the end of the Han dynasty and laid the foundation for the Cao Wei state. His mother was Lady Du (杜夫人), a concubine of Cao Cao. She also bore Cao Cao another son, Cao Gun. In 211, Emperor Xian, the last emperor of the Han dynasty, enfeoffed Cao Lin as the Marquis of Raoyang (饒陽侯). In 217, Cao Lin's title was changed to "Marquis of Qiao" (譙侯). In 221, a year after Cao Lin's half-brother Cao Pi usurped the throne from Emperor Xian and became the first emperor of the Cao Wei state, he enfeoffed Cao Lin as the Duke of Qiao (譙公). One year later, Cao Pi elevated Cao Lin from a duke to a prince under the title "Prince of Qiao" (譙王). In 226, he changed Cao Lin's title to "Prince of Juancheng" (鄄城王). In 232, Cao Pi's successor, Cao Rui, changed Cao Lin's title to "Prince of Pei" (沛王). Throughout the reigns of the subsequent Wei emperors, the number of taxable households in Cao Lin's dukedom increased until it reached 4,700. After Cao Lin died in 256, his son Cao Wei (曹緯) inherited his princedom as the new Prince of Pei. Cao Lin had a daughter, who married Ji Kang.

See also
 Cao Wei family trees#Lady Du
 Lists of people of the Three Kingdoms

Notes

References

 Chen, Shou (3rd century). Records of the Three Kingdoms (Sanguozhi).
 Pei, Songzhi (5th century). Annotations to Records of the Three Kingdoms (Sanguozhi zhu).

Year of birth unknown
256 deaths
Family of Cao Cao
Cao Wei imperial princes